The Motorways in Kosovo ( or Autoudhë, Serbian: Autoput) are the controlled-access highway system in the Kosovo, that are predominantly under the supervision of the Ministry of Infrastructure.

The motorways in Kosovo are marked with a special road sign, similar to the road sign depicting a motorway in other countries of Europe. The markings has green background and are identified as consisting of letter R and the motorway number assigned by the legislation.

Motorways

Completed

Future projects

See also 

 Highways in Kosovo
 Transport in Kosovo
 Economy of Kosovo

Notes

References

External links 

 Ministry of Infrastructure of Kosovo Official Website